Jackling is a surname which may refer to:

Daniel C. Jackling (1869–1956), American mining and metallurgical engineer
Sir Roger Jackling (diplomat) (1913–1986), British ambassador
Sir Roger Jackling (born 1943), British civil servant
Tom Jackling (c.1750–1797), English bare-knuckle boxer, ring name Tom Johnson